The concept of Microlearning originates from a Greek word 'Micro' that means 'small'. It refers to a set of compact e- learning modules that are based mainly keeping the 'learner fatigue in mind. The learning modules could be educational, professional, or skill based . These modules are  designed in short and  concise units with a single learning objective or topic that are usually less than 20 minutes long.

Microlearning concept
As an instructional technology, microlearning focuses on the design of learning modules through micro steps in digital media environments. These activities can be incorporated into learner's daily routines and tasks. Unlike "traditional" e-learning approaches, microlearning often tends towards push technology through push media, which reduces the cognitive load on the learners. Breaking the information down into topical, bite-sized chunks helps to increase attention and promotes higher retention rates. Research shows that microlearning can result in significant increase of exam pass rates (up to 18%). The technique has also been shown to increase learner confidence with the material. 

A modern definition of Microlearning refers to a learning technique that involves bite size lessons to engage learners in the process. Furthermore, microlearning marks a transition from common models of learning towards micro perspectives on and the significance of micro dimensions in the process of learning. Microlearning has also been considered as a promising topic in work-based learning and the applications of microlearning have been widely studied in different fields. As of 2020, there were at least 476 relevant publications exploring the concept. The technique is capable  to address challenges associated with slow learners. It is functional not only for skill based education but also for sustainable socioeconomic development and without taking care of micro-perspectives in the context of learning, education, training and skill development, a skill based education cannot be imparted effectively.

Framework

Microlearning framework is characterized by the following parameters:                                                                                   

Time: Microlearning modules are specifically designed as concise and short courses.

Content: The design allows course content to be divides into smaller segments that would usually cover a single topic.

Curriculum: A short course covering a specific topic or a series of short courses covering a bigger module.

Form: It could vary depending on its intended use like knowledge nuggets, episodes, skill sets etc.

Process: The process of microlearning involves an integrated learning segment that could be in the form of in person session, video, text, followed by an assessment to gauge  performance of the learner.

Media: In person or In class, distance learning or remote both of which may be based on multimedia activities.

Subscription learning
Subscription learning provides an intermittent stream of learning-related interactions to those who are subscribed. These learning-related interactions (also called "nuggets") can involve a great variety of learning-related events, including content presentation, diagnostics, scenario-based questions, job aids, reflection questions, assignments, discussions, etc. Nuggets are short, usually presented in less than five to ten minutes. Nuggets are intentionally scheduled over time to support learning, often utilizing research-based findings related to the spacing effect. Learners subscribe (or are subscribed) to one or more series of learning nuggets, called "threads". Learning threads can be predesigned, selecting nuggets based on anticipated learner needs or they can be dynamically created based on learner performance.

Action Plan 
 Microlearning Activity can be designed as an individual  or as a group learning experience with appropriate prompts to gauge performance of the learners. The focus however is to keep the information short and relevant in order to maintain concentration. The activity itself could include either of the following;  reading a paragraph, listen to an informational podcast, watch a video clip, or an infographic etc. Once observation of the content is completed, it is then followed by assessment in the form of short quizzes, Microgames, reflection of viewed content etc. . The content of the design depends upon the mode of delivery. For example, An informational podcast would be more suitable for self paced learner who have access to the relevant source on the other hand reading a paragraph from the book could be more functional for  more traditional learners.

Applications (examples)
 Screensavers which prompt the user to solve small series of simple tasks after a certain amount of inactivity
 Quizzes with multiple choice options on cell phones by use of sms or mobile applications (java midlets, symbian)
 Word of the day as daily RSS-feed or e-mail
 Flashcard-software for memorizing content through spaced repetition
 Short videos (2–10 minutes) either presented stand alone or in a series

See also
 Microformats
 Microlecture

References

Bibliography 
 Giurgiu, Luminiţa (2017) : Microlearning an Evolving Elearning Trend 
 Gassler, Gerhard; Hug, Theo & Glahn, Christian (2004): Integrated Micro Learning – An outline of the basic method and first results. In: Auer, Michael E. & Auer, Ursula (eds.): International Conference on Interactive Computer Aided Learning, ICL 2004, Sept. 29 – Oct. 1, 2004, Villach, Austria (CD-ROM).
 Gstrein, Silvia & Hug, Theo (2005): Integrated Micro Learning during Access Delays. A new approach to second language learning. In: Zaphiris, Panayiotis (ed.): User-centered computer assisted language learning. Hershey:Idea Group Publishing, pp. 152–175.
 Hagleitner, Wolfgang; Drexler, Arthur; Hug, Theo (2006). Evaluation of a prototypic version of Knowledge Pulse in the context of a management course. Paper presented at the Multimedia Applications in Education Conference, 2006, September 4–6, FH Joanneum, Graz, Austria.
 Hug, Theo; Lindner, Martin; Bruck, Peter A. (eds.) (2006): Microlearning: Emerging Concepts, Practices and Technologies after e-Learning. Proceedings of Microlearning 2005. Innsbruck: Innsbruck University Press, 2006.
 Weber, Charles M. (2003): Rapid Learning in High Velocity Environments. Ph.D. thesis, Massachusetts Institute of Technology (M.I.T.) / Cambridge (U.S.A.).
 Leong, K., Sung, A., Au, D., & Blanchard, C. (2020). A review of the trend of microlearning. Journal of Work-Applied Management.

Educational technology
Learning
Technical communication
E-learning